The Neum Agreement is an unimplemented treaty between Croatia and Bosnia and Herzegovina granting free passage of Croatian transit traffic between the territory of Dubrovnik-Neretva County around the city of Dubrovnik and forming a pene-exclave of Croatia and the remaining Croatian territory through the municipality of Neum.

The agreement was signed in Zagreb, Croatia on 22 November 1998 and followed by a protocol of 11 December 2001 further regulating the issue. The agreement provides for unobstructed transit of vehicles with Croatian license plates and documents traveling from and to Croatian territory, and prohibits loading or unloading of goods or passengers and changes of mode of transportation except in cases of traffic accidents or vehicle breakdowns, but allows officials of Bosnia and Herzegovina to prohibit transit of goods whose import is not permitted due to health concerns. The agreement finally provides that it shall be in force as long as the Ploče Agreement, regulating use of the Port of Ploče by Bosnia and Herzegovina, is implemented.

, the treaty is still not ratified (it was not published in Narodne novine) and there is no actual route permitting the type of transit provided for by the agreement where vehicles would not stop for border controls in the area. However, one lane at the border is designed to declare that the traveler is only transiting between parts of Croatia, and those driving in this lane are usually not stopped for border control.

Currently the Klek/Neum 1 and Neum 2/Zaton Doli border crossings on the D8 state road are open to international road traffic, along with Vukov Klanac and Imotica border checkpoints which are open to local traffic only.

See also

 Motorway construction in the area: 
 Transport in Croatia

References

Treaties of Bosnia and Herzegovina
Treaties of Croatia
Treaties concluded in 1998
Bosnia and Herzegovina–Croatia relations